Arandel is a French musical project. The album In D (a nod to Terry Riley In C album) lays the foundations of a dogma only allowing music instruments use and banning samplers and other MIDI devices. Encouraging the concept of a creator's vanishing behind its creation, Arandel is an anonymous project, which members and actual composition remain unknown. To that end, any representation or identification of its contributors is prohibited, especially live photographs and videos.

Anecdotes 
 Arandel means "swallow" in Haute-Savoie regional dialect.
 An Arandel live version, whose composition is always moving, is currently touring. The first show took place on August 2010 during “La Carrière Soirs d’Été” festival.

Discography

Albums 
 2010 : In D
 2011 : In D Remixed
 2011 : In D (vinyl version w/ bonus tracks)
 2014 : Solarispellis
 2015 : Umbrapellis
 2016 : Extrapellis
 2017 : Aleae

EPs 
 2010 : In D#5 EP
 2010 : In D#3 EP

Remixes

Mixtapes 
 2009 : Carols, the Minuit mixtape
 2010 : Aube, the Ringing Bells mixtape
 2010 : Spéléoliennes, the Library mixtape
 2012 : Neige, the Christmas mixtape
 2013 : Hocus Pocus, The Berghain mixtape
 2014 : C'est La Mode, A Podcast About Fashion In The French 60's
 2016 : Bog Bog, the Electronic Ladyland mixtape
 2017 : From Beyond, the Halloween mixtape

Live music and artistic installations 
 October 2013 : « Cosme & Damiaõ », a play by Gilles Pastor,  KastorAgile company (Salvador de Bahia, Brazil)
 May 2012 : « Un homme qui dort », a play by Alexandra Rübner inspired by Georges Perec’s novel (Le Trident, Cherbourg)
 June 2011 : « Poussières », Alexandra Rübner reading, based on a texts by Barbey D'Aurevilly (Le Trident, Cherbourg)
 April 2011 : “In Tono Rumori”, installation at la Gaîté Lyrique in Paris, for 150 speakers on three floors, composed around the theatre walls’ memory. 
 May 2010 : « L'Infante », a play by Maxence Garnier (Ciné 13, Paris)

References

Ambient music groups
French film score composers
French space rock musical groups
Dream pop musical groups
French electronic music groups
French record producers
Musical groups from Auvergne-Rhône-Alpes